Daniel Waggoner (July 7, 1828 – September 5, 1902) was an early American settler and rancher in Texas. He also owned five banks, three cottonseed oil mills, and a coal company. He established the Waggoner Ranch, which spanned eight counties: Wise County, Clay County, Wichita County, Wilbarger County, Foard County, Baylor County, Archer County, and Knox County. In 1959, he was inducted into the Hall of Great Westerners of the National Cowboy & Western Heritage Museum.

Early life
Daniel Waggoner was born on July 7, 1828, in Lincoln County, Tennessee. His father, Solomon Waggoner, was a farmer, cattleman and horse and slave trader. His mother was Elizabeth (McGaugh) Waggoner. He moved to Hopkins County, Texas with his parents in 1848.

Career
In the 1850s, he moved from Hopkins County to Wise County, Texas with his son, an African slave, six horses and 242 Longhorn cattle. They settled on Catlett Creek, near Decatur. The land was 'open range' when they first arrived.

In 1856, he purchased 320 acres of land near Cactus Hill, and moved his family there. He later purchased more land on Denton Creek, seven miles east of Decatur. Each time, the whole family moved with him. Over the next three decades, he purchased more land in Wise County as well as Clay County, Wichita County, Wilbarger County, Foard County, Baylor County, Archer County, and Knox County.

Some of the land was acquired after he sent gunslinger Jimmie Roberts to intimidate small farmers into selling it to them. However, many sold it willingly, as there was a drought at the time. Many of those small farmers moved to Lockett, Texas, where they enjoyed access to the Seymour Aquifer. Waggoner's landholdings became known as the 'Waggoner Ranch.' The ranch operated under the company name of 'Waggoner and Son.'

With his son, he also owned five banks, three cottonseed oil mills, and a coal company.

Personal life
He was married twice. His first wife was Nancy (Moore) Waggoner, the daughter of William Moore, whom he married in the late 1840s. They had a son, William Thomas Waggoner. He became a widower shortly thereafter.

In 1859, he married Sicily Ann (Halsell) Waggoner, the daughter of Electious and Elizabeth J. Halsell. She was only sixteen years old at the time, while he was thirty-one. In 1883, he built the Waggoner Mansion, also known as 'El Castile', in Decatur, where he resided with his family.

Death
He died of kidney disease on September 5, 1902, in Colorado Springs, Colorado.

References

1828 births
1902 deaths
People from Lincoln County, Tennessee
People from Wise County, Texas
Businesspeople from Colorado Springs, Colorado
Ranchers from Texas
Businesspeople from Texas
American bankers
People from Decatur, Texas